The European cat snake (Telescopus fallax), also known as the Soosan snake, is a venomous colubrid snake endemic to the Mediterranean and Caucasus regions.

Geographic range
It occurs in Italy, Greece (Paros, Antiparos, Tourlos, Crete, Kalymnos, Samos, Milos, Corfu), Albania, coastal Slovenia, Croatia (including some Adriatic islands), Herzegovina, Montenegro, North Macedonia, southern Bulgaria, Turkey, Malta, Cyprus, Iran, Iraq, Lebanon, Syria, Israel, southern Russia (Caucasus region), Armenia, Georgia, and Azerbaijan.

Ecology
The European cat snake is venomous, but because it is rear-fanged (fangs are located at the back of the upper jaw), it rarely injects its venom in defensive biting, and is therefore considered no threat to humans. It feeds mainly on geckos and lizards.

The species can be found in open and scrubby country including beaches and open woodlands.

Subspecies
5 subspecies are currently recognized.

Telescopus fallax cyprianus (Barbour & Amaral, 1927) - Cyprus

Telescopus fallax fallax (Fleischmann, 1831) - Northeastern Italy, Greece (Paros, Mykonos, Antiparos, Crete, Kalymnos, Samos, Kimolos, Milos, Corfu, Syros), Albania, coastal Croatia, Slovenia, Bosnia and Herzegovina, Montenegro, Macedonia, southern Bulgaria, Turkey, Malta, Cyprus, Iran, Iraq, Syria, Israel, southern Russia, Armenia, Republic of Georgia, and Azerbaijan.

Telescopus fallax iberus (Eichwald, 1831) - Armenia, Azerbaijan, South Georgia, southern Russia, northern Iran, and East Turkey. 

Telescopus fallax pallidus (Stepanek, 1944) - Crete, Gavdos, Elasa and Christiana Islands.

Telescopus fallax syriacus (Boettger, 1880) - Lebanon, Syria, Jordan, southeast Turkey and northern Israel.

References

Further reading
 Arnold EN, Burton JA. 1978. A Field Guide to the Reptiles and Amphibians of Britain and Europe. London: Collins. 272 pp. + Plates 1-40. . (Telescopus fallax, pp. 207–210 + Plate 38, Figures 4a, 4b + Map 120). 
 Fleischmann FL. 1831. Dalmatiae Nova Serpentum Genera. Erlangen, Germany: C. Heyder. 35 pp. (Tarbophis fallax, new species, p. 18).

External links
Video of Telescopus fallax on YouTube
Video of Telescopus fallax on YouTube
Movement of Telescopus fallax on YouTube

Telescopus
Reptiles of Western Asia
Reptiles of Europe
Reptiles described in 1831
Reptiles of Russia